Iodoacetic acid is a derivative of acetic acid. It is a toxic compound, because, like many alkyl halides, it is an alkylating agent. 

It reacts with cysteine residues in proteins. It is often used to modify SH-groups to prevent the re-formation of disulfide bonds after the reduction of cystine residues to cysteine during protein sequencing.

Peptidase inhibitor
Iodoacetate is an irreversible inhibitor of all cysteine peptidases, with the mechanism of inhibition occurring from alkylation of the catalytic cysteine residue (see schematic). In comparison with its amide derivative, iodoacetamide, iodoacetate reacts substantially slower. This observation appears contradictory to standard chemical reactivity, however the presence of a favourable interaction between the positive imidazolium ion of the catalytic histidine and the negatively charged carboxyl-group of the iodoacetic acid is the reason for the increased activity of iodoacetamide.

Possible cancer therapy 
Several studies have shown iodoacetate has anti-tumor effects. In 2002 Dr. Fawzia Fahim showed that "a single IAA treatment of tumor-bearing mice significantly increased the levels of plasma lactate dehydrogenase (LDH) activity, while it also significantly decreased the levels of plasma glucose and liver total protein, RNA and DNA, compared to normal controls." In 1975 Melvin S. Rhein, Joyce A. Filppi and Victor S. Moore showed that iodoacetate improved the immune response of bone marrow. In 1966 Charles A. Apffel, Barry G. Arnason & John H. Peters showed anti-tumor activity for iodoacetate.

As a disinfection by-product

Iodide is a naturally occurring ion that can be found in many source waters and it is easily oxidized by wastewater disinfectants.  One of the products of iodide oxidation is hypoiodous acid (HOI or OI−) which is capable of reacting with background organic materials to generate iodinated disinfection by-products (DBPs) including iodoacetic acid.  In a study performed by Plewa, et al., IAA was determined to be one of the most cytotoxic of those studied, with a median lethal dose on the order of magnitude of 10−5 M.  It was the most genotoxic of more than 60 DBPs studied and is the most genotoxic DBP identified thus far. Iodoacetic acid has exhibited traits indicating it as a potential carcinogen, however, it has not been proven to be carcinogenic. The trend continues in teratogenicity, with iodoacetic acid's potency surpassing that of its brominated and chlorinated analogs. Its toxicity correlates to its ability as an alkylating agent, which will modify cysteine residues in proteins. Monohaloacetic acids are the most toxic, with toxicity increasing with halogen size. Iodoacetic acid is more toxic than bromoacetic acid and much more toxic than chloroacetic acid.

See also
 Iodoacetamide

References

Further reading

External links
 The MEROPS online database for peptidases and their inhibitors: Iodoacetate

Acetic acids
Alkylating agents
Organoiodides